John Harcourt may refer to:
 J. M. Harcourt (John Mewton Harcourt), Australian writer
 John Simon Harcourt, British member of parliament
 John Harcourt (MP, died 1825), British member of parliament for Ilchester, and for Leominster